Syndie is an open-source cross-platform computer application to syndicate (re-publish) data (mainly forums) over a variety of anonymous and non-anonymous computer networks.

Syndie is capable of reaching archives situated in the following anonymous networks: I2P, Tor, Freenet.

History 
Syndie has been in development since 2003 and ties in closely with the I2P network project, which is considered a parent project.
Following the departure of lead developer Jrandom in 2007, work on syndie was paused. Active development resumed for a period, with the most recent release in 2016.

Concept 
Syndie operates in a manner similar to blogs, newsgroups, forums, and other content tools; it allows one or more authors to privately or publicly post messages. Messages are pushed and pulled to and from archive servers (other peers that choose to be), which are hosted in a variety of anonymous and non-anonymous locations.

Most archive servers are HTTP archives hosted inside the I2P network, but there are syndie archives in Freenet as well as the normal internet. Each archive does not control the content stored on it; by default all messages are pushed and pulled by all participants. In this way, every message is backed up by every user, so should one archive go down, the content can be pushed to a different archive then pulled by other users of that archive. This means that even if all of the users and archives delete a message, as long as one person has it and there is one pushable archive, the message will be redistributed to every user.

Users have the option to delete locally stored messages after a set time, after the local storage consumes a certain amount of disk space, or by blacklists of users.

Each user can create multiple identities. Each identity is known as a forum, and users can post into their own or different forums. Each user can control their forum; for example, they may wish to run a blog by not permitting other people to start threads, but allowing them to post comments.

Technical requirements 
Syndie is a Java application and as such can run on any platform on which Java is supported; although a standard widget toolkit is required for the graphical user interface versions.

Syndie is primarily a graphical application, based on the Standard Widget Toolkit for Java, but it can be run in a CLI (headless) mode.

See also
 Distributed computing, Distributed Networking, Distributed database
 I2P - The development of Syndie and I2P currently overlap.
 Anonymous P2P
 Osiris (Serverless Portal System) - Support P2P web forum.
 Internet forum

References

External links
 
 www.syndie.i2p inside the I2P network
 Syndie web forum at I2P forums
 Syndie at infoAnarchy.org (web site about infoanarchism)

Cross-platform free software
Free Internet forum software
Free routing software
Free software programmed in Java (programming language)
Cryptographic software
Anonymity networks
Internet privacy
Free network-related software
I2P